Fishbone cactus or zig-zag cactus is the common name of several cacti:

 Disocactus anguliger
 Selenicereus anthonyanus
 Weberocereus imitans